The Madison Valley Formation is a geologic formation in Montana. It preserves fossils dating back to the Neogene period.

See also

 List of fossiliferous stratigraphic units in Montana
 Paleontology in Montana

References
 

Neogene Montana